The Indiana Hoosiers women's volleyball team is currently coached by Steve Aird, who began in 2018.

Year by year highlights

Historical Statistics
*Statistics through 2015 season

See also
List of NCAA Division I women's volleyball programs
Big Ten Conference volleyball

References

External links